José Manuel Imbamba (born 7 January 1965 in Boma, Moxico Province, Angola) is an Angolan priest and the archbishop of Saurímo since 12 April 2011.

Biography
Ordained as a priest in 1991, he graduated from the Pontifical Urban University in Rome in 1999.

Pope Benedict XVI appointed him as the bishop of Dundo in 2008. He was consecrated by Bishop Filomeno do Nascimento Vieira Dias on the following 14 December. On 12 April 2011 he was appointed the first archbishop of Saurímo.

From 22 to 27 September 2015 he was in Philadelphia, at the World Meeting of Families with Pope Francis.

See also

References

External links 

 Page of Saurímo Archdiocese on Website of Episcopal Angolan Conference

21st-century Roman Catholic archbishops in Angola
People from Moxico Province
Living people
Angolan clergy
1965 births
Roman Catholic archbishops of Saurímo
Roman Catholic bishops of Dundo